Marek Szczęsny (born 30 July 1939) is a Polish contemporary painter.

He has participated in more than thirty solo and group exhibitions throughout Europe and the US. He currently lives and works in Paris.

Early life

Marek Szczęsny was born in Radom, Poland, on 30 July 1939. Szczęsny was born in the year of the outbreak of WWII and spent his earlier life in occupied and post-war Poland.

Wanting to become an artist, Marek took private art lessons and in the late 1950s moved to Gdańsk, where he began attending lectures at the State Academy of Fine Arts in Gdańsk. In the 1960s he began associating with a group of artists from the Żak - a student cultural club in Gdańsk. During this time he met the Polish painter Tadeusz Brzozowski. In 1967 Szczęsny had his debut exhibition at Żak. Thanks to Brzozowski the commission at the Polish Ministry of Culture granted Szczęsny the status of artist and membership to the Association of Polish Visual Artists.

Career 
In the 1970s, Marek Szczęsny left Gdańsk and moved to Zakopane. For four years he was a member of the “GOPR” - the mountain rescue team specializing in winter rescue - in the Tatras, but continued to draw. Between 1970 and 1978 he exhibited his works in both group and solo exhibitions across Poland, Italy and Spain. It would be another 12 years before Szczęsny exhibited in Poland again (in 1991 as part of the group exhibition ‘Jesteśmy’ at Zachęta National Gallery of Art, Poland).

In 1978 Szczęsny left Poland for Paris and two years later was granted a Ford Foundation scholarship in 1980. At this time Szczęsny began to exhibit his work regularly in Europe.

From 2003 he had individual exhibitions in museums in France and Poland and was included in the exhibition “Polish Artists of the Twentieth Century” in France. In 2008 he had a solo exhibition entitled “Gravitation” at the Foksal Gallery in Warsaw. In 2016 in an exhibition titled “La Dechirure” at the Atlas Sztuki gallery in Łódź Szczęsny created a large wall sized installation using torn paper, cardboard and wood.

Between 1996 and 2008 Marek Szczęsny was awarded grants from the Pollock-Krasner Foundation and the Adolph and Esther Gottlieb Foundation in New York and the Bemis Center for Contemporary Art in Omaha, Nebraska. He was also an artist in residence at the Edward F. Albee Foundation in Montauk, New York.

Szczęsny has participated in exhibitions across France, Poland, Luxembourg, Switzerland, Italy, the US, Japan, Germany and Austria.

Exhibitions 
 30 January - 13 March 2015, Marek Szczęsny, l’étrangère
 23 Jun 2016 – 31 Jul 2016, Layered Narratives: Collage/Photomontage/Print, l'étrangère

References

External links 
 Official site
 Financial Times, 21/22 December 2014
 Marek Szczęsny - artsy.net

1939 births
Living people
Polish contemporary painters
Polish contemporary artists